Aljajahua (possibly from Aymara allqa multicolored, q'awa little river, ditch, crevice, fissure, gap in the earth, "multicolored brook (or ravine)") is a mountain in the Huanzo mountain range in the Andes of Peru, about  high. It is situated in the Arequipa Region, Condesuyos Province, Cayarani District. Aljajahua lies between the Pumaranra valley in the east and the Huañajahua valley ("dry brook") in the west.

References 

Mountains of Peru
Mountains of Arequipa Region